Two Australian rules football Hall of Fame umpires have been named Jack McMurray: 

 Jack McMurray, Sr. (1889–1988)
 Jack McMurray, Jr. (1915–2004)